Semagystia lacertula is a moth in the family Cossidae. It was described by Staudinger in 1887. It is found in Kyrgyzstan and Uzbekistan.

References

Natural History Museum Lepidoptera generic names catalog

Cossinae
Moths described in 1887